The Blonds is a 2003 Argentine and American documentary/drama film, directed by Albertina Carri, and written by Carri and Alan Pauls.

The award winning film documents the search of director Albertina Carri as she investigates what happened to her family during Argentina's "Dirty War."

The themes: Why did they disappear?  Why were they murdered?  Film critics have called the work an autobiographical semi-documentary work.

The drama/documentary was filmed in black-and-white and in color.

Synopsis
The film deals with a child, whose parents were among the tens of thousands of Argentines who were murdered during the military junta's Dirty War, who years later has to contend with the pain barely remembered.

In this case the child is director Albertina Carri.

She returns with her film crew to the house she lived in the 1970s and interviews the neighbors about her parents and what happened.

The movie's title comes from an elderly woman's insistent (and, as it turns out, wrong) recollection that Carri's family members all had blond hair.

Carri tries to determine the following in the doc: Who were the Carris? How did they disappear? Were they blond or brunette? Were they heroes or merely a fiction of those who remember them?

In addition to appearing on camera herself, Ms. Carri is played by actress Analía Couceyro.

Background

Basis of film

The film is based on the real political events that took place in Argentina after Jorge Rafael Videla's reactionary military junta assumed power on March 24, 1976.  During the junta's rule: the parliament was suspended, unions, political parties and provincial governments were banned, and in what became known as the Dirty War between 9,000 and 30,000 people deemed left-wing "subversives" disappeared from society.

Style
The documentary/drama has, what some critics have called, an odd style. For example, director Carri appears on film as herself in some scenes, but also uses an actor to portray her in other scenes. A.O. Scott writes that the film "is not so much a documentary as a fictional film about the making of a documentary, or perhaps a documentary about the making of a fictional film about the making of a documentary."

Cast
 Analía Couceyro as Albertina Carri
 Albertina Carri as herself
 Santiago Giralt as himself
 Jesica Suarez as herself
 Marcelo Zanelli as himself

Critical reception
Critic A.O. Scott, writing for The New York Times, believes the odd style of the documentary made its impact less forceful.  He wrote, "The film's open-ended, recursive structure is central to Ms. Carri's intellectual agenda, which is to emphasize the deceptive, indeterminate nature of the truth...Too much of the film is in a mood of chin-scratching detachment, and this creates a vacuum in which its powerful, confrontational moments lose their force, the trauma of the past pushed nearly out of reach."

Critic Kevin Jack Hagopian thought the film's message is important, and wrote, "Los rubios is absurd, tragic, and sometimes, hilarious. It seeks not to eulogize the disappeared in solemn, self-important terms, but to make them as alive and real in the cultural sphere as they are in the political arena, a Borgesian lesson in the ultimate fiction: that of ultimate certainty."

Awards
Wins
 Buenos Aires International Festival of Independent Cinema: Audience Award, Albertina Carri; New Cinema Award, Albertina Carri; Special Mention, Albertina Carri; 2003.
 Clarin Entertainment Awards: Clarin Award; Best Documentary, Albertina Carri; 2003.

Nominations
 Buenos Aires International Festival of Independent Cinema: Best Film, Albertina Carri; 2003.
 Gijón International Film Festival: Grand Prix Asturias; Best Feature, Albertina Carri; 2003.

References

External links
  Official web site
 
 Los rubios at the cinenacional.com 
 

2003 films
2003 drama films
American black-and-white films
Argentine black-and-white films
American docudrama films
Political drama films
Dirty War films
Films about Latin American military dictatorships
Films shot in Argentina
Argentine independent films
2000s Spanish-language films
American independent films
2000s American films